The Denmark women's junior national handball team is the national under-19 handball team of Denmark. Controlled by the Danish Handball Federation it represents Denmark in international matches.

History

World Championship

European Championship

Coaching staff

References

External links
 

Women's handball in Denmark
Women's national junior handball teams
Handball